Gorran may refer to:

Geographic places
St Goran, a civil parish in Cornwall which includes the settlements of:
Gorran Churchtown
Gorran Haven
Gorran, County Londonderry, a townland in County Londonderry, Northern Ireland

People
Nicholas of Gorran, a French preacher

Political Parties
Gorran Movement, the Movement for Change in Iraqi Kurdistan